MA Bari is a politician from the Bagerhat District of Bangladesh and an elected a member of parliament from Khulna-6.

Career 
Bari was elected to parliament from Khulna-6 as an Awami League candidate in 1973 Bangladeshi general election.

References 

Possibly living people
People from Bagerhat District
Awami League politicians
1st Jatiya Sangsad members